Āmāra bhitara bāhirē antarē antarē, also known as ভালো আছি ভালো থেকো (Bhālō āchi bhālō thēkō) is a Bengali romantic poem written by  Bangladeshi poet Rudra Mohammad Shahidullah. It was later adopted as a song, which gained notable popularity in Bangladesh and the Indian state of West Bengal.

History
Rudra Mohammad Shahidullah was the former spouse of writer Taslima Nasrin, who were separated in 1986. This song was regarded by Shahidullah as a suicide note to Nasrin.

The song become popular in Bangladesh after it was used in a Bengali drama serial aired in Bangladesh Television in 1992. It was later used in the Bangladeshi movie "Tomakey Chai'' by singers Andrew Kishore & Kanak Chapa in 1996.

The song was popularized in West Bengal by singer Kabir Suman, by releasing a duet album with Sabina Yasmin, titled, Tero (2006). The song is featured in this album.

In 1992, the Jahangirnagar University based band, TeerThak released their first album, Duari. The song is the first track of this album.

And, Symphony released the song in their album Anubhabe. The song is the thirteenth track of the album of the band.

See also
Manusher Manchitra, Bengali book written by Rudra Mohammad Shahidullah

References

Bengali poetry
Bengali-language songs
Bangladeshi songs
Bangladeshi poems
Kabir Suman songs
Bangladeshi film songs
Andrew Kishore songs
Kanak Chapa songs